The Drachen Studio Kecur Royal 912 is a German ultralight trike, designed and produced by Drachen Studio Kecur of Mettmann. The aircraft is supplied as a complete ready-to-fly-aircraft.

Design and development
It features a cable-braced hang glider-style high-wing, weight-shift controls, a two-seats-in-tandem open cockpit, tricycle landing gear with wheel pants and a single engine in pusher configuration.

The aircraft is made from bolted-together aluminum tubing, with its single surface wing covered in Dacron sailcloth. Its  span wing is supported by a single tube-type kingpost and uses an "A" frame weight-shift control bar. The powerplant is a four-cylinder, air and liquid-cooled, four-stroke, dual-ignition  Rotax 912 or  Rotax 912S engine.

The aircraft carriage is manufactured under sub-contract in Slovenia.

Specifications (Royal 912)

References

External links

2000s German sport aircraft
2000s German ultralight aircraft
Single-engined pusher aircraft
Ultralight trikes